The Ethiopian Kale Heywet Church (  "The Ethiopian Word of Life Church") is an evangelical denomination, headquartered in Addis Ababa, Ethiopia.

History
The Ethiopian Kale Heywet Church was founded in 1927 in southern Ethiopia by the evangelical missionary organization Sudan Interior Mission and Dr. Thomas Alexander Lambie.

The first missionaries had initially planned a trip into the western part of Ethiopia, but after prayer felt that they were being led to the South Central area. The early missionary work was concentrated among the Welayta, Kambaata and Sidama peoples, which are the three most densely populated awrajas (regions) in Ethiopia. At Dembi Dollo, Lambie worked with an Ethiopian evangelist named Gidada Solon.

The few missionaries who entered the country all had to leave during the country's invasion by the Italians. They left a handful of believers with the translation of portions of scriptures and the Gospel of Mark. What the missionaries returned after the five-year occupation of the country, the handful of believers had become thousands, and the fledgling congregation was very strong. Planting this church in Ethiopia cost the lives of three of the earliest missionaries. Nearly 100 missionaries worked for about ten years before they left the country during the invasion. 

Returning missionaries, aside from church planting in unreached areas, provided biblical and theological teachings to the growing church. Since 1974, the Ethiopian Kale Heywot Church Development Commission, a church-related humanitarian aid organization, has had an supported schools in the south and west of the country by providing teacher salaries, books, tables and chairs.

Statistics
In 2013, it had a reported 7,774 churches and 6.7 million members. In 2020, the Christian denomination had 9 million members, 10,000 churches, nine theological schools and 145 Bible schools.

Beliefs 
The denomination has an Evangelical confession of faith, based on its Baptist roots.

See also 
Christianity in Ethiopia

References

External links 
 Kale Heywet Church website
 Kale Heywet Church website North America

Evangelical megachurches in Ethiopia
Charismatic denominations
Pentecostalism in Africa